Encrinuraspis is an extinct genus of trilobites in the order Phacopida.

References

External links 
 Encrinuraspis at the Paleobiology Database

Encrinuridae genera
Silurian trilobites of Europe